The Continental Cup 1999–2000 was the third edition of the IIHF Continental Cup. The season started on September 24, 1999, and finished on December 28, 1999.

The tournament was won by HC Ambrì-Piotta, who won the final group.

Preliminary round

Group A
(Sofia, Bulgaria)

Group A standings

Group B
(Nowy Targ, Poland)

Group B standings

Group C
(Bucharest, Romania)

Group C standings

Group D
(Dunaújváros, Hungary)

Group D standings

Group E
(Lyon, France)

Group E standings

Group F
(Angers, France)

Group F standings

First Group Stage

Group G
(Oświęcim, Poland)

Group G standings

Group H
(Zvolen, Slovakia)

Group H standings

Group J
(Milan, Italy)

Group J standings

Group K
(Székesfehérvár, Hungary)

Group K standings

Group L
(Cardiff, United Kingdom)

Group L standings

Group M
(Sheffield, United Kingdom)

Group M standings

 HC Košice,
 HC Keramika Plzeň,
 VEU Feldkirch,
 HC Ambrì-Piotta,
 Ak Bars Kazan,
 HK Neman Grodno     :  bye

Second Group Stage

Group N
(Plzeň, Czech Republic)

Group N standings

Group O
(Ambrì, Switzerland)

Group O standings

Group P
(Kazan, Russia)

Group P standings

 Eisbären Berlin    :  bye

Final Group Stage
(Berlin, Germany)

Final Group standings

References
 Continental Cup 2000

1999–2000 in European ice hockey
IIHF Continental Cup